Christian-Norberto Nzinga (born 12 June 1985) is a French-born Angolan footballer playing for Floridians FC in Florida.

Career
He played in some good league clubs in Belgium, Germany, Norway and Italy.

Youth and amateur
Born in Paris, Nzinga was signed by West Ham United at age 16 and he stayed at the club for three and a half years.

Professional
He played in good league clubs during his career. In 2005/2008 he has been playing in Germany second bundesliga Italy serie B but he also join one club in serie c1 during the season. In 2012 Nzinga was signed in France amateur club For some raison concerning his family He signed for Finnsnes on level 4 in Norway in June 2009 but left the club after a month and 2 appearances.

In February 2010, Nzinga made a move across the Atlantic when he signed with AC St. Louis of the USSF Division 2 Professional League. He made six league appearances for AC St. Louis, as well as featuring in two Lamar Hunt U.S. Open Cup games. He has been call up for the Angola national team for the game against Mexico in Huston it was the first call up under the responsibility of the coach Hérver renard

References

External links
 Official AC St. Louis biography

1985 births
Living people
Footballers from Paris
French footballers
French people of Angolan descent
Association football defenders
West Ham United F.C. players
1. FC Saarbrücken players
U.S. Triestina Calcio 1918 players
AC St. Louis players
French expatriate sportspeople in Norway
Expatriate footballers in England
French expatriate footballers
Expatriate footballers in Germany
French expatriate sportspeople in England
Expatriate footballers in Norway
French expatriate sportspeople in the United States
French expatriate sportspeople in Italy
Expatriate footballers in Belgium
Expatriate footballers in Italy
French expatriate sportspeople in Belgium
USSF Division 2 Professional League players